= Cormar Carpets =

British carpet manufacturer

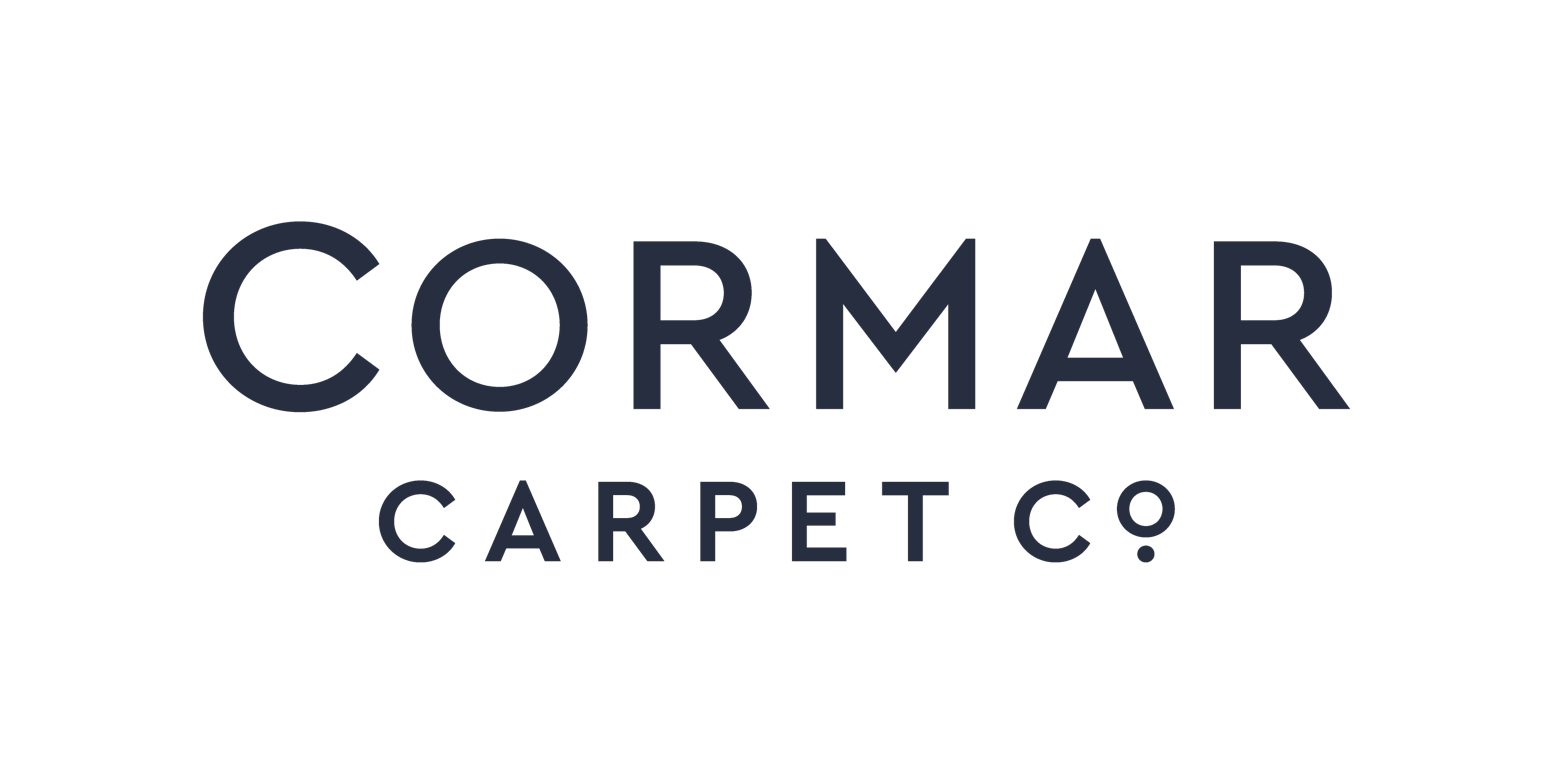

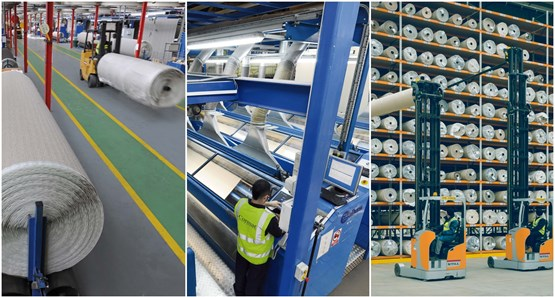

Cormar Carpet Company is a British manufacturer of tufted carpet based in Greater Manchester. It produces and distributes over 15 million square metres of primarily residential carpet per annum from its three sites: Holme Mill and Brookhouse Mill in the Bury area, and a regional distribution centre in Hemel Hempstead.

== Overview ==
Cormar is privately owned and employs over 280 people. It owns a transport fleet of over 70 vehicles and supplies flooring retailers, wholesalers, and contractors throughout Great Britain and Ireland.

Turnover in 2018 was £129m, ranking Cormar as one of the largest tufted carpet manufacturers in the UK by volume and value.

== History ==
Formerly known as Greenwood & Coope (originally a textiles accessory supply business started in 1924), Cormar Carpets was set up by the late Neville Cormack OBE, one of the first companies to start producing tufted carpet in Britain in 1956 at Nunn Hill Mills in the Rossendale Valley, Lancashire. It moved to Brookhouse Mill in Greenmount in 1959, and a second mill, Holme Mill in Ramsbottom, was purchased through the acquisition of Holmebury Carpets in 1973.

Cormar continues to produce all its easy-clean, soft deep-pile, wool twist, and wool loop carpets at these two mills. In 2018, Cormar opened a new, purpose-built 130,000 sq ft regional distribution centre in Hemel Hempstead to serve the south and central areas of England and Wales.
